Pusan National University Yangsan Campus Station is a station on the Busan Metro Line 2 in Mulgeum-eup, Yangsan, South Gyeongsang, South Korea.

History
Its name was originally Yangsan Pusan National University Hospital, but it was changed as of January 10, 2009. Trains previously didn't stop at the station from January 10, 2008 until it was opened on October 1, 2009.

Nearby places
A shuttle bus connects the station to Yangsan Pusan National University Hospital.
 Yangsan Busan National University Hospital
 Busan National University Dental Hospital
Busan Institute of Scientific Investigation

References

External links

  Cyber station information from Busan Transportation Corporation

Metro stations in Yangsan
Railway stations opened in 2009